Meri Behan Maya is a 2011 Pakistani TV romantic drama serial broadcast by Geo TV. It was first aired on 17 September 2011. The serial was directed by Azfar Ali and the project head was Iqbal Ansari. It was written by Haseena Moin and the cast included Neelam Muneer, Annie Jaffrey, Danish Taimoor and Javed Sheikh.

The show was broadcast in India on Zindagi, aired from 12 January 2015, under the title Maya.

Plot 
Maya (Jaffrey) and Zarmeena (Muneer) are sisters who dearly love each other. Their father Shazeb Khan (Shaikh) loves them dearly. Though their stepmother Attiya (Bindiya) dislikes them both especially Maya. She tries to create problems for Maya as she is not the real daughter of Shazeb Khan. Meanwhile, Zarmeena is in love with Faizar (Taimoor) and plans to marry him. Things take a turn for the worse when Attiya conspires with her son Rashid (Zarrar Khan) and kidnaps her. Meanwhile, Maya finds Rashid's conspiracy as he is a supplier of girls and sells them to a brothel and when she finds this, she attacks Rashid and runs away. She takes refuge in her friend's house Zeb (Amna Karim). Zeb was also a victim to Rashid's web. She tries to help Maya to face fear. Meanwhile, Faizar's parents break off the engagement with Zarmeena as Faizar's father knows Attiya as a high-class prostitute. Angered, Faizar leaves the house after the argument with his father. Rashid gets arrested and interrogated by police on orders of Shazeb. Attiya, who bails out Rashid divorces Shazeb and threatens to destroy him. Maya soon gets a job as a Hotel Manager. After knowing that Maya is Shazeb's illegitimate child she hates him and runs away. Shazeb suffers from a stroke and hospitalized. Soon after recovering, he finds Maya is again kidnapped by Rashid who threats Maya to ruin her face by acid. Attiya wants all cases to withdraw from Rashid. Rashid leaves Maya after Shazeb takes the case away. Rashid gets killed by police after he tried to kill Maya. Maya returns home safely, reconciles with her sister and Faizar's father stops him to go away. Faizar marries Zarmeena and Maya playfully teases Faizar.

Cast 

 Neelam Muneer as Zarmeena
 Ainy Jaffri as Maya
 Danish Taimoor as Faizar
 Javed Sheikh as Shahzeb Khan
 Bindiya as Attiya Shahzeb
 Shamim Hilaly as Khala
 Farah Nadeem as Salma
 Zarrar Khan as Rashid
 Sanam Khan as Naima
 Amna Karim as Zeb

Reception
The drama was written by the legendary scriptwriter Haseena Moin, thus people had a lot of expectations from it. The drama was very well received by the critics and the audience. The fresh story depicting a positive relationship between the two sisters was immensely liked. Annie Jaffry won several accolades for her challenging role as Maya and was appreciated by everyone. The drama was shot at scenic locations in Murre. The drama also received good TRPs, the last episode got average TRPs of 4.2, the highest of that month for Geo TV. The drama was also listed in the top 10 drama serials of 2012 by Geo TV. But the makeup of Bindya and Neelam Muneer was heavily criticized.

Soundtrack 

Meri Behan Maya's title song Tell Me Why is sung by Mehwish Hayat, composed by Waqar Ali and lyrics by Muhammad Nasir. The song of this drama serial became immensely popular due to its different lyrics and catchy music. The lines of the song are frequently used during the course of the show.

References

External links 
 
 

2012 Pakistani television series debuts
Pakistani drama television series
Urdu-language television shows
Geo TV original programming
2013 Pakistani television series endings
Zee Zindagi original programming